Gustav Anton Zeuner (30 November 1828 – 17 October 1907) was a German physicist, engineer and epistemologist, considered the founder of technical thermodynamics and of the Dresden School of Thermodynamics.

Life

University and Revolution
Zeuner was born in Chemnitz, Saxony. His first training in the subject of engineering was at the Chemnitz Königliche Gewerbeschule (Royal Vocational School), today Chemnitz University of Technology, where he studied from 1843-1848.

In 1848 he moved the short distance to the Bergakademie (Mining Academy) in Freiberg, today also a university of technology, where he studied mining and metallurgy. He developed close links with one of his professors, the famous mineralogist Albin Julius Weisbach, with whom he worked on several projects.

The university course was disrupted, however, during the revolutions which took place all over Germany. Large popular assemblies and mass demonstrations took place, primarily demanding freedom of the press, freedom of assembly, arming of the people, and a national German parliament. Zeuner joined the revolutionaries on the barricades in Dresden during the May Uprising in 1849. Unlike many of his compatriots, some of whom were sentenced to death or sent to the workhouse, Zeuner was pardoned. He was able to complete his course, and even completed his PhD at the University of Leipzig in 1853, but was banned from ever teaching at any Saxon university.

Escape to Zürich

In 1853, Zeuner took over as the editor of the engineering magazine "Der Civilenginieur. Zeitschrift für das Ingenieurwesen", the first German magazine specialising in mechanics, which ran until 1896. He continued in this position until 1857, even after moving to Zürich in 1855 to work as a professor for technical mechanics at the ETH Zürich, the Swiss Federal Institute of Technology in Zürich. There he worked alongside famous engineers such as Franz Reuleaux. Other Dresden revolutionaries had fled their home country for Zürich (Richard Wagner, Gottfried Semper, Theodor Mommsen).

It was in Zürich that Zeuner made his model of a locomotive front end in 1858; he recognised its potential for creating momentum but was only interested in the theory and did not develop the design any further. Also in Zürich (in 1869) Zeuner invented the three-dimensional population graph now sometimes known as a Zeuner diagram but more often as a Lexis diagram after Wilhelm Lexis who modified the idea slightly.

From 1859 Zeuner worked the stand-in director of the ETH Zürich, and in May 1865 he took over the  position officially. His former professor, Albin Weisbach, commemorated his friend's acquisition of the post by naming a mineral after him - the transparent green crystal zeunerite.

Return to Germany

In 1871 Zeuner returned to Germany and was once again able to work with Weisbach when he succeeded his old friend as director of the Freiberg Mining Academy. He also taught there until 1875 as a professor of mechanics and the study of mining machinery. This was now possible, despite the teaching ban which had been placed on him, because of the amnesty granted to all the revolutionaries in 1862.

In 1873, while still director of Freiberg Mining Academy, Zeuner also took on the post of director at the Royal Saxon Polytechnicum in Dresden (now Technische Universität Dresden). Zeuner's efforts there led to the introduction of the humanities; the extension of the range of subjects taught resulted in the polytechnic's rise to a full-scale polytechnic university in 1890.

In 1889, aged 61, Zeuner gave up his position as director of the polytechnic to work as a lecturer until his retirement in 1897. On retiring he was made an emeritus professor. Zeuner died in Dresden in 1907.

Gustav Zeuner Award
Since 1993, the German Association of Engineers (Verein Deutscher Ingenieure or VDI) has presented students with the Gustav Zeuner Award for the best engineering thesis in Germany; Zeuner supported the Dresden branch of the VDI at its foundation in 1897.

Publications
 Die Schiebersteuerungen mit besonderer Berücksichtigung der Lokomotivsteuerungen (Slide-valve controls with particular emphasis on locomotive controls) Freiberg 1858
 Grundzüge der mechanischen Wärmetheorie (Basics of mechanical heat theory) 1860
 Technische Thermodynamik (Technical Thermodynamics) 1887; translated in English in 1907 as Technical Thermodynamics

See also
Piston valve (steam engine)
Zeuner water turbine

References

Further reading

 Das Leben und Wirken von Gustav Anton Zeuner by Gerd Grabow, published 1984 by Deutscher Verlag für Grundstoffanalyse.

German mechanical engineers
19th-century German physicists
People of the Revolutions of 1848
Engineers from Chemnitz
Leipzig University alumni
1828 births
1907 deaths
Recipients of German royal pardons
Academic staff of ETH Zurich
Thermodynamicists